Coquatrix is a French surname variant of cockatrice. Notable people with the surname include:

Bruno Coquatrix (1910–1979), French music producer
Paulette Coquatrix (1916–2018), French costume designer

See also
Cockatrice (disambiguation)

French-language surnames